Alex Clarke was a rugby union player for London Scottish, having formerly played for Bristol.

Alex Clarke's position of choice is as a Prop.

He was called into the England Saxons squad to face Italy A in Ragusa, Sicily on 9 February 2008.

Notes

External links
Bristol profile
England profile

1981 births
Living people
English rugby union players
Bristol Bears players
People educated at Colston's School
Rugby union props